In enzymology, an isovaleryl-CoA dehydrogenase is an enzyme that catalyzes the chemical reaction

3-methylbutanoyl-CoA + acceptor  3-methylbut-2-enoyl-CoA + reduced acceptor

Thus, the two substrates of this enzyme are 3-methylbutanoyl-CoA and acceptor, whereas its two products are 3-methylbut-2-enoyl-CoA and reduced acceptor.

This enzyme belongs to the family of oxidoreductases, specifically those acting on the CH-CH group of donor with other acceptors. The systematic name of this enzyme class is 3-methylbutanoyl-CoA:acceptor oxidoreductase. Other names in common use include isovaleryl-coenzyme A dehydrogenase, isovaleroyl-coenzyme A dehydrogenase, and 3-methylbutanoyl-CoA:(acceptor) oxidoreductase. This enzyme participates in valine, leucine and isoleucine degradation. It employs one cofactor, FAD.

Structural studies

As of late 2007, only one structure has been solved for this class of enzymes, with the PDB accession code .  It was created by a group containing K.A.Tiffany, D.L.Roberts, M.Wang, R.Paschke, A.-W.A.Mohsen, J.Vockley, and J.J.P.Kim.  The structure was released on May 20th, 1998.

Leucine metabolism

References

 
 
 

EC 1.3.8
Flavoproteins
Enzymes of known structure
Mitochondrial proteins